The Zira FK 2017-18 season wa Zira's third Azerbaijan Premier League season, and fourth season in their history. It is their first full season with Aykhan Abbasov as manager, during which they finished the season in fourth place, qualifying for the UEFA Europa League for the second year in a row. Zira were also knocked out of the Azerbaijan Cup by Neftchi Baku at the Quarterfinal stage whilst also reaching the Second qualifying round of the Europa League before defeat by Astra Giurgiu.

Squad

Transfers

In

Out

Loans in

Released

Trial

Friendlies

Competitions

Overview

Premier League

Results summary

Results

League table

Azerbaijan Cup

UEFA Europa League

Qualifying rounds

Squad statistics

Appearances and goals

|-
|colspan="14"|Players who left Zira during the season:

|}

Goal scorers

Disciplinary record

References

Notes

Azerbaijani football clubs 2017–18 season
Zira FK
Zira